Robert M. Daines is an American lawyer, currently the Pritzker Professor of Law and Business at Stanford Law School. His work focuses on the intersection of law and economics, such as issues related to IPOs and mandatory disclosure regulations.

Daines has a bachelor's degree from Brigham Young University (BYU) and a J.D. degree from Yale Law School. Prior to joining Stanford's faculty in 2004 Daines was a professor at New York University from 1997 to 2004.

Daines has served as Associate Dean for Global and Graduate Programs at Stanford Law School and also been head of the admissions committee for Stanford Law School.

Daines is a member of The Church of Jesus Christ of Latter-day Saints.

Daines and his wife are the parents of five children.

References

Stanford Law School faculty
American lawyers
Latter Day Saints from California
Living people
Brigham Young University alumni
Yale Law School alumni
New York University faculty
Latter Day Saints from New York (state)
Year of birth missing (living people)